The Graah Mountains ( or Graah Bjerge) are a mountain range in southeastern Greenland. Administratively this range is part of the Kujalleq municipality.

This mountain group was named after Wilhelm August Graah, who described them for the first time during his 1829 expedition to the little known eastern coast of Greenland in search of the lost Eastern Norse Settlement. The area of the range is currently uninhabited.

Geography
The Graah Mountains are relatively little glaciated craggy and steep nunataks rising above the glaciers in the King Frederick VI Coast. The range runs roughly from east to west from the Irminger Sea coast to the Greenland ice sheet west of Kangerluk Fjord, between Kangerluluk Fjord in the north and Iluileq Fjord (Danell Fjord) in the south.

Graah described this group of mountains from the coast in the following terms:

See also
List of mountain ranges of Greenland
List of Nunataks#Greenland
Amphibolite

References

External links
Aeromagnetic map of South Greenland 
Earth's continental land masses created in short, fast bursts, scientists say
Mountain ranges of Greenland
Nunataks of Greenland